America's News Headquarters (seen on air as America's News HQ) was a weekend afternoon news program broadcast on Fox News Channel; it also refers to the headline recaps showing at the top and bottom of the non-hard news hours. The show has also been broadcast from 1-4am (weeknights) or 1-6am (weekends) ET during nights of heavy breaking news/event coverage. During election years the program is temporarily replaced by America's Election Headquarters. The term "America's HQ" (and later "News HQ" / "Election HQ") is seen on the bottom of the channel's rotating logo (on the left hand side) after the Election season.

America's News HQ follows the same format as its predecessor, Fox News Live.

The weekday edition of America's News HQ was replaced on the schedule with The Daily Briefing with Dana Perino on October 2, 2017.

History 
The former short-lived weekday 5:00 p.m. ET broadcast was hosted at various intervals by Jane Skinner, Heather Nauert, Jon Scott, Martha MacCallum, Bill Hemmer, and Megyn Kelly. On January 19, 2009, Glenn Beck took over this time slot when he began hosting a self-titled show, The Glenn Beck Program. America's News HQ continued airing on the weekends.

On May 2, 2009, the program broadcasting from the network's New York City studios launched in high-definition (HD). On October 3, 2009, the program broadcasting from the Fox News' Washington, D.C. studios also launched in HD.

The weekday edition was relaunched following the 2016 U.S. presidential election, taking the same 2:00 p.m. ET time slot previously held by America's Election HQ. Melissa Francis, formerly a semi regular co-host of Outnumbered, has become the most frequent host of the show's weekday version. Sandra Smith, now co-host of America's Newsroom, anchored both the first (on November 14, 2016) and last broadcasts (on September 29, 2017) of this version.

Currently, America's News HQ airs from Noon to 6pm ET each Saturday. On Sunday, it airs from Noon to 2pm and 3pm to 5pm ET.

As of March 6, 2021, America's News Headquarters was replaced by "Fox News Live" airing in the same time slots as the former newscast.

Hosts 
Regular 
 Leland Vittert - Weekend afternoons
 Arthel Neville – Saturday afternoon/evenings; Sunday midday/mid-afternoons
 Eric Shawn – Saturday afternoon/evenings; Sundays midday/mid-afternoons
Semi Regular 
 Gillian Turner - Weekend afternoons
 Kristen Fisher - Weekend afternoons
 Jillian Mele - Fill in
 Molly Line - Weekend afternoons

References

External links 
 Official Website

Fox News original programming
2008 American television series debuts